The Play-offs of the 2011 Fed Cup Americas Zone Group I were the final stages of the Group I Zonal Competition involving teams from the Americas. Using the positions determined in their pools, the eight teams faced off to determine their placing in the 2011 Fed Cup Americas Zone Group I, the top countries of each pool played for first to second, while the bottom two of each pool competed for fifth to eighth. The top team advanced to World Group II Play-offs, and the bottom two teams were relegated down to the Americas Zone Group II for the next year.

Promotional round
The first placed teams of each pool played in a head-to-head round. The winner advanced to the World Group II Play-offs, where they'd get a chance to advance to World Group II.

Argentina vs. Colombia

3rd to 4th play-off
The second placed teams of each pool played in a head-to-head round to find the third and fourth placed teams.

Peru vs. Brazil

Relegation play-offs
The last placed teams of each pool were drawn in head-to-head rounds. The loser of each round was relegated down to the Americas Zone Group II in 2012.

Paraguay vs. Mexico

Chile vs. Bolivia

Final placements

  advanced to the World Group II Play-offs, where they were drawn against . However, they lost 0–4, and thus were assigned back to Group I for 2012.
They both qualified for the promotional play-offs and won their matches, meaning they advanced back to Group I for 2013.

See also
 Fed Cup structure

References

External links
 Fed Cup website

2011 Fed Cup Americas Zone
 Sports competitions in Buenos Aires
Tennis tournaments in Argentina